Jason Hathaway (born November 22, 1976) is a Canadian professional stock car racing driver. He formerly competed in the NASCAR Pinty's Series, driving Team 3 Red Racing's No. 3 Chevrolet entry, and is the 2020 champion of the series.

Racing career

NASCAR Camping World Truck Series
In 2017, Hathaway made his Truck Series debut at Mosport, driving the No. 66 Chevrolet Silverado for Bolen Motorsports. He started 22nd and finished 15th.

Hathaway returned to the series for the Phoenix race. He drove the No. 15 Chevrolet Silverado for Premium Motorsports instead, and finished 11th after starting 23rd.

NASCAR Pinty’s Series
Hathaway began racing in the Canadian Tire Series in 2007, driving the No. 3 of Team 3 Red Racing owned by Ed Hakonson. He had a best finish of 2nd overall in the 2015 standings and has won 9 races in the series.

In 2016, Hathaway announced his retirement from the Pinty's Series after 121 races ran over 12 seasons.

In 2019, Hathaway announced his intentions to return to racing in the Pinty's Series, driving Team 3 Red's No. 3 Chevrolet Camaro.

In the abbreviated 2020 season, Hathaway won three of the tour's six races en route to winning the championship.

Motorsports career results

NASCAR
(key) (Bold – Pole position awarded by qualifying time. Italics – Pole position earned by points standings or practice time. * – Most laps led.)

Camping World Truck Series

Pinty's Series

K&N Pro Series East

 Season still in progress
 Ineligible for series points

References

External links
 

Living people
1976 births
NASCAR drivers
Racing drivers from Ontario
Canadian racing drivers